Alexander "Sasha" Jeltkov (born 25 February 1978 in Tbilisi) is a Canadian male artistic gymnast, representing his nation at international competitions, most notably the 2000 and 2004 Summer Olympics. He also competed at world championships, including the 2003 World Artistic Gymnastics Championships in Anaheim.

References

External links 
 
 

1978 births
Living people
Canadian male artistic gymnasts
Place of birth missing (living people)
Gymnasts at the 2000 Summer Olympics
Gymnasts at the 2004 Summer Olympics
Olympic gymnasts of Canada
Gymnasts at the 1999 Pan American Games
Gymnasts at the 1998 Commonwealth Games
Gymnasts at the 2002 Commonwealth Games
Commonwealth Games medallists in gymnastics
Commonwealth Games gold medallists for Canada
Commonwealth Games silver medallists for Canada
Commonwealth Games bronze medallists for Canada
Pan American Games medalists in gymnastics
Pan American Games gold medalists for Canada
Pan American Games silver medalists for Canada
Pan American Games bronze medalists for Canada
20th-century Canadian people
21st-century Canadian people
Medallists at the 1998 Commonwealth Games
Medallists at the 2002 Commonwealth Games